Marang may refer to:

Places
 Marang (district), a district in Malaysia
 Marang (federal constituency)
 Marang, Terengganu, a town in Malaysia
 Marang River, a river of Terengganu, Malaysia
 Marang (plant), a Filipino common name for Artocarpus odoratissimus
 Marang, Iran, a village in Iran
 Marang, Nepal, a village in Nepal

People
 Akuot Mercy Marang, South Sudanese social activist and singer
 Ido Marang (1918–1970), French field hockey player
 Marang Molosiwa (born 1992), Botswana actress

See also